Kim Dong-young (born 1988) is a South Korean actor. He is known for his roles in both films and television series, notably Drinking Solo (2016), The Age of Shadows (2016), Room No.7 (2017), My Strange Hero (2018–2019), and River Where the Moon Rises (2021).

Filmography

Film

Television series

References

External links

1988 births
Living people
21st-century South Korean male actors
South Korean male film actors
South Korean male television actors